John Hennigan (born August 10, 1970) is an American professional poker player from Philadelphia, Pennsylvania, who, in his career, has won six World Series of Poker bracelets and a World Poker Tour (WPT) title.

Daniel Negreanu and Gavin Smith have stated in interviews that they consider Hennigan to be the best player they have faced.

Hennigan is nicknamed "Johnny World" because he is willing to bet on anything in the world. Before specializing in poker, he was also a professional pool player.

World Series of Poker 
Hennigan finished 19th in the 1999 World Series of Poker (WSOP) $10,000 no limit hold'em main event.

In April 2002 he made the final table of the WSOP $1,500 seven-card stud event and won his first bracelet just four days later in the $2,000 H.O.R.S.E. event, taking home the $117,320 first prize after defeating a final table including Men Nguyen and Phil Ivey.

In 2004, he won his second WSOP bracelet in the $5,000 limit hold'em event, defeating a final table that included James McManus, David Chiu and T. J. Cloutier.

Hennigan made another two WSOP final tables in 2005, including a second-place finish in the $5,000 2 to 7 draw lowball no limit event, finishing just behind David Grey.

In 2014, he won the $50,000 Players Championship for over $1.5 million, and collecting his third WSOP bracelet. The Championship is regarded as one of the most prestigious events one can win during a poker career. At the 2018 WSOP, he came in second in this event, earning $765,837.

World Series of Poker bracelets

World Poker Tour 
Hennigan has made two World Poker Tour (WPT) final tables, finishing 4th in the Five Diamond World Poker Classic in 2002 won by Gus Hansen then winning the 2007 Borgata Winter Open, earning a little over $1.6 million.

Other poker events 
Hennigan won The 2002 United States Poker Championship's $7,500 no limit hold'em main event, defeating Erik Seidel in heads-up play, earning $216,000 prize. He also cashed in the same event in 2003, finishing 5th.

Hennigan was inducted in the Poker Hall of Fame in 2018.

As of 2019, his total live tournament winnings exceed $8,450,000. His 45 cashes as the WSOP account for over $5,700,000 of those winnings.

References 

American poker players
American pool players
Living people
Sportspeople from Philadelphia
World Series of Poker bracelet winners
World Poker Tour winners
1970 births
Place of birth missing (living people)
Poker Hall of Fame inductees